Aurora "Rory" Block (born November 6, 1949, in Princeton, New Jersey) is an American blues guitarist and singer, a notable exponent of the country blues style.

Career
Aurora Block was born in Princeton and grew up in Manhattan. Her father, Allan Block, ran a sandal shop in Greenwich Village in the 1960s, and the Greenwich Village folk music scene, such as Peter Rowan, Maria Muldaur, and John Sebastian influenced Block to study classical guitar. At the age of 14, she met guitarist Stefan Grossman, who introduced her to the music of Mississippi Delta blues guitarists.

Block began listening to old albums, transcribing them, and learning to play the songs. At age 15, she left home to seek out the remaining blues giants, such as Mississippi John Hurt, Reverend Gary Davis, and Son House, and hone her craft in the traditional manner of blues musicians; then she traveled to Berkeley, California, where she played in clubs and coffeehouses.

After retiring temporarily to raise a family, Block returned to the music industry in the 1970s with middling success until signing with Rounder Records in 1981, who encouraged her to return to her love for the classical blues form. Since then she has carved out her own niche, releasing numerous critically acclaimed albums of original and traditional songs, including many Robert Johnson covers, such as "Terraplane Blues" and "Come on in My Kitchen". Her 1986 album, I've Got a Rock in My Sock, included contributions from Taj Mahal and David Bromberg. The same year, Block's 19 year old son, Thiele, died in an automobile accident.  Her tribute to him, House of Hearts, contained mostly Block penned tracks.

Angel of Mercy, Turning Point, and Tornado included mostly original compositions. However, Mama's Blues, Ain't I a Woman and When a Woman Gets the Blues featured songs written by Tommy Johnson, Robert Johnson, Lottie Beaman, and Mattie Delaney.

In 2010, Block released her autobiography in .pdf format and a limited print run titled When A Woman Gets The Blues.

Awards
Rory Block has won six Blues Music Awards, two for "Traditional Blues Female Artist" (1997, 1998), three for "Acoustic Blues Album of the Year" (1996, 1999, 2007), and the 2019 "Acoustic Artist of the Year".  She also won NAIRD awards for "Best Adult Contemporary Album of the Year" in 1994 for Angel of Mercy and again in 1997 for Tornado.

Discography

Festival appearances
Pinkpop Festival, Netherlands - 1989
Belgium Rhythm 'n' Blues Festival - 1989
Long Beach Blues Festival - 1993
San Francisco Blues Festival - 1999
Notodden Blues Festival - 2006
Kemptville Live Music Festival - 2017
New Orleans Jazz Festival - 2022

Further reading
Block, Rory When A Woman Gets The Blues (CreateSpace Independent Publishing Platform 14 April 2011)

References

External links
Telarc (record label) biography
Illustrated 1964–1987 Rory Block discography (early recordings not shown on official website)
Illustrated Allan Block discography (Aurora's father)
Representative's artist page
Stony Plain Records artist page

1949 births
Living people
American blues singers
American blues guitarists
Slide guitarists
Country blues musicians
Songwriters from New Jersey
People from Princeton, New Jersey
Singers from New Jersey
Contemporary blues musicians
Chrysalis Records artists
Guitarists from New Jersey
20th-century American guitarists
Stony Plain Records artists
Rounder Records artists
Telarc Records artists
20th-century American women guitarists
21st-century American women